Marvel Mills Logan (January 7, 1874October 3, 1939) was an American politician and attorney who served as a member of the United States Senate from Kentucky and the Attorney General of Kentucky.

Early life and education 
Logan was born on a farm near Brownsville, Kentucky He taught school for two years and also conducted a training school for teachers. He then studied law and was admitted to the bar in 1896.

Career 
He practiced law in Brownsville. He served as chairman of the board of trustees of Brownsville; as county attorney of Edmonson County 1902–1903; as assistant Attorney General of Kentucky 1912–1915; as Attorney General of Kentucky 1915–1917; and as chairman of the Kentucky Tax Commission 1917–1918.

He then moved to Louisville, Kentucky in 1918 and then to Bowling Green, Kentucky in 1922, continuing to practice law. He served as a member of the State Board of Education, the State Board of Sinking Fund Commissioners, and the State Board of Printing Commissioners. He served as a justice of the Kentucky Court of Appeals 1926–1930 and as Chief Justice in 1931.

Logan was elected as a Democrat to the United States Senate in 1930 and reelected in 1936 and served from March 4, 1931, until his death. While in the Senate he served as chairman of the Committee on Mines and Mining (Seventy-third through Seventy-fifth Congresses) and on the Committee on Claims (Seventy-sixth Congress).

In 1933 Logan chaired the subcommittee dispatched to Louisiana by the United States Senate to investigate allegations of corrupt activities of the political machine of Huey Long during the 1932 election of John H. Overton to the Senate. Logan's inquiry reported that the election was impacted by fraud, specifically the involvement of dummy candidates and deducts (money taken from public employees' pay for use by the Long machine), but no action was taken against Overton.

Personal life 
In 1896, Logan married Della Haydon Logan (1873–1951) and they had four children.

In 1929, Logan was elected Grand Sire (now Sovereign Grand Master) of the Independent Order of Odd Fellows, governing the fraternity at an international level.

Logan died in Washington, D.C. on October 3, 1939, and is buried in the Logan family cemetery near Brownsville.<

See also 
 List of United States Congress members who died in office (1900–49)

References

External links 

"Memorial Services held in the House of Representatives of the United States, together with remarks presented in eulogy of Marvel Mills Logan late a Senator from Kentucky frontispiece 1941"

1874 births
1939 deaths
Judges of the Kentucky Court of Appeals
Kentucky Attorneys General
American prosecutors
Democratic Party United States senators from Kentucky
Burials in Kentucky
Kentucky Democrats
Road incident deaths in Washington, D.C.